Ek Se Bure Do is a 2009 Bollywood black comedy film directed by Tarique Khan and starring Arshad Warsi, Anita Hassanandani and Rajpal Yadav. The film was shot in 2007 but released in 2009.

Plot
Tito (Arshad Warsi) and Tony (Rajpal Yadav) are two conmen who run into and fall in love with two sisters, Payal (Anita Hassanandani) and Gehna (Tusha). The girls have run away from their home and uncle, Vikramaditya (Govind Namdeo). Meanwhile, small-time don Jagat Dada (also played by Govind Namdeo) enlists the help of Tito-Tony to steal a treasure map from a police station. Tito-Tony accomplishes the task but, instead of giving Jagat the real map, they hand him a fake copy forged by Mamu (Razak Khan), So, while Jagat and his men so, in a futile search for the treasure, Tito-Tony go after the real one, which is in Vikramaditya's house. Soon, Jagat realizes that he has been conned, and also becomes aware that he looks like Vikramaditya. Since Vikramaditya is away from home, Jagat Dada goes into his house pretending to be Vikramaditya. The chase for the fortune begins in earnest and after the mandatory mix-ups; the police come and arrest Jagat Dada and his men.

Cast
 Arshad Warsi as Tito
 Anita Hassanandani as Payal
 Rajpal Yadav as Tony
 Tusha as Gehna
 Govind Namdeo as Vikramaditya / Jagat Dada
 Lankesh Bhardwaj as Deva
 Yashpal Sharma
 Jagdeep

Soundtrack

External links
 
 

2009 films
2000s Hindi-language films
2009 black comedy films
Indian black comedy films
2009 comedy films